There are 95 counties in the U.S. State of Tennessee. The least populous county was Pickett County (5,079) and the smallest in area was Trousdale County, covering . The oldest county is Washington County, founded in 1777. The most recently formed county is Chester County (1879).

The center of population pinpoints the location at which the population of the state, as placed on a map of the state where they reside, would balance out the map. In 1976, the Rutherford County Historical Society marked the geographic center of Tennessee with an obelisk.

Some of the counties were formed in part or completely from lands previously controlled by American Indians. The "Indian lands" were territories that American Indians had occupied from pre-Columbian times and to which they were granted the legal right of occupancy in an act of the United States government. In cases where counties had been formed from that territory, the legal right of American Indian occupancy was revoked in a federal act prior to the formal establishment of the county. For Tennessee, ten treaties were negotiated between 1770 and 1835, defining the areas assigned to European settlers and to American Indians, regulating the right of occupancy regarding the lands. The remaining indigenous population was eventually removed from Tennessee to what became the state of Oklahoma.

The Federal Information Processing Standard (FIPS) code, which is used by the United States government to uniquely identify counties, is provided with each entry. FIPS codes are five-digit numbers; for Tennessee the codes start with 47 and are completed with the three-digit county code. The FIPS code for each county in the table links to census data for that county.


Alphabetical list

|}

Defunct counties 
There are two defunct counties in Tennessee:
 James County, Tennessee (1870–1919): Now part of Hamilton County. The county seat was Ooltewah.
 Tennessee County, Tennessee (1788–1796): When Tennessee achieved statehood, the previous Tennessee County in North Carolina became Tennessee County, Tennessee, and was divided into Montgomery and Robertson Counties.

Consolidated counties 
Three Tennessee counties operate under consolidated city–county governments, a city and county that have been merged into one jurisdiction. As such, these governments are simultaneously a city, which is a municipal corporation, and a county, which is an administrative division of a state.
 City of Nashville and Davidson County
 City of Lynchburg and Moore County
 City of Hartsville and Trousdale County

See also 
 List of municipalities in Tennessee

References

External links 

Tennessee Counties official websites at County State Info
County Technical Assistance Service at the University of Tennessee
Tennessee County Landforms

Tennessee

Counties
Tennessee